Belgenland was the name of two Red Star Line passenger ships:

, operated by Red Star from 1879 until 1904
, operated by Red Star from 1923 until 1934

Ship names